Gladys may refer to:

 Gladys (given name), people with the given name Gladys
 Gladys (album), a 2013 album by Leslie Clio
 Gladys (film), 1999 film written and directed by Vojtěch Jasný
 Gladys, Virginia, United States
 Gladys the Swiss Dairy Cow, a 2002 sculpture of a cow
 Hurricane Gladys (1968)
 Talia Gladys, a character in the anime series Gundam Seed Destiny
 the launch name used for USA-215, an American reconnaissance satellite
 a character from the novel The Lost World
 a character in the cartoon The Grim Adventures of Billy & Mandy

See also
 Michael Gladis (born 1977), American actor
 GLADIS, a character from the cartoon series Totally Spies!